Louise Wong Tan-ni (born 3 July 1990) is a Hong Kong actress and model. She is best known for her role as Cantopop singer and actress Anita Mui in the 2022 biographical musical drama film Anita, which earned her Best New Performer winning and Best Actress nomination at the 40th Hong Kong Film Awards.

Filmography

Film

Drama

Music Video

Awards and nominations

References

External links 
 
 

1990 births
Living people
Hong Kong film actresses
21st-century Hong Kong actresses
Hong Kong female models